John Hunter Carrington (October 25, 1934 – February 28, 2017) 
was an American politician. Republican former member of the North Carolina General Assembly who long represented the state's fifteenth Senate district, including constituents in Wake county. 
He headed a major company in the evidence-collection and security business.

Carrington was born in Philadelphia, Pennsylvania; he enlisted in the United States Army in 1953 and served as a paratrooper during the Korean War until 1955.  Following his military service, he completed his high school education in 1957 and earned a degree in mechanical engineering from Widener College in 1962.  Professionally, Carrington rose to become CEO of the Sirchie Group, a company specializing in evidence-collection gear for police and top-dollar security products for businesses.  
He was first elected to the North Carolina Senate in 1995.

In 2005, Carrington was charged with illegally exporting evidence-collection gear to China and took a plea bargain in December 2005 to felony charges in which he has been fined $850,000.  One of his companies also took a plea agreement in the matter.

References

External links

|-

1934 births
2017 deaths
North Carolina state senators
Politicians from Philadelphia
United States Army soldiers
United States Army personnel of the Korean War
Widener University alumni
21st-century American politicians